Neoscelis is a genus of beetles belonging to the family Scarabaeidae.

Species
 Neoscelis coracina Mudge & Ratcliffe, 2003
 Neoscelis dohrni (Westwood, 1855)
 Neoscelis longiclava Morón & Ratcliffe, 1989

Cetoniinae